North River Shores is an unincorporated area and census-designated place (CDP) in Martin County, Florida, United States. The population was 3,459 at the 2020 census, up from 3,079 in 2010. It is part of the Port St. Lucie Metropolitan Statistical Area.

Geography
North River Shores is located in northeastern Martin County at  (27.222999, -80.270851). It is bordered to the east by the city of Stuart, the Martin county seat, to the south by the tidal North Fork of the St. Lucie River, and to the west by St. Lucie County. U.S. Route 1 runs along the eastern edge of the community, leading south  to the center of Stuart and north  into the eastern part of Port St. Lucie.

Demographics

2020 census

As of the 2020 United States census, there were 3,459 people, 1,553 households, and 898 families residing in the CDP.

2000 census
As of the census of 2000, there were 3,101 people, 1,417 households, and 916 families residing in the CDP. The racial makeup of the CDP was 97.84% White, 0.52% African American, 0.13% Native American, 0.61% Asian, 0.26% from other races, and 0.64% from two or more races. Hispanic or Latino of any race were 1.81% of the population.

There were 1,417 households, out of which 21.4% had children under the age of 18 living with them, 54.7% were married couples living together, 7.6% had a female householder with no husband present, and 35.3% were non-families. 29.5% of all households were made up of individuals, and 17.8% had someone living alone who was 65 years of age or older.  The average household size was 2.18 and the average family size was 2.68.

In the CDP, the population was spread out, with 17.8% under the age of 18, 4.6% from 18 to 24, 21.8% from 25 to 44, 25.3% from 45 to 64, and 30.5% who were 65 years of age or older.  The median age was 49 years. For every 100 females, there were 89.3 males.  For every 100 females age 18 and over, there were 85.4 males.

The median income for a household in the CDP was $43,813, and the median income for a family was $55,052. Males had a median income of $47,330 versus $26,118 for females. The per capita income for the CDP was $28,449.  About 5.6% of families and 5.3% of the population were below the poverty line, including 11.2% of those under age 18 and 2.0% of those age 65 or over.

References

Census-designated places in Martin County, Florida
Port St. Lucie metropolitan area
Census-designated places in Florida